Abbey is a given name. It is the given name of:
Abbey Bartlet, a fictional character played by Stockard Channing on the television serial drama, The West Wing
Abbey Bominable, daughter of the Yeti, from Monster High
Abbey Clancy (born 1986), English lingerie and catwalk model
Abbey Green (born 1997), Australian footballer
Abbey Holmes (born 1991), Australian women's footballer for Adelaide Crows
Abbey Lee Kershaw (born 1987), Australian fashion model
Abbey Lincoln (1930–2010), African-American jazz vocalist
Abbey-Leigh Stringer (born 1995), English footballer